Puka Urqu (Quechua puka red, urqu mountain, "red mountain",  Hispanicized spelling Pucaorcco) is a  mountain in the western extensions of the La Raya mountain range in the Andes of Peru. It is situated in the Cusco Region, Canas Province, Layo District, and in the Canchis Province, Marangani District.

References

Mountains of Cusco Region
Mountains of Peru